Swaroopa (Metamorphosis) is a 2017 Sri Lankan Sinhala drama film directed by Dharmasena Pathiraja and co-produced by Dharmasena Pahtiraja himself with Mohan Mabotuwana. It stars W. Jayasiri and Nita Fernando in lead roles along with Thusitha Laknath and Lakshman Mendis. Music composed by Nadeeka Guruge. Newcomer Reeni de Silva debuted in the Sinhala cinema with the film. It is the 1285th Sri Lankan film in the Sinhala cinema.

Though the film scheduled to premier on 8 September 2017 in Rithma circuit theatres, it was delayed to 29 September 2017. The film received positive reviews from critics.

Plot
The story revolves around a middle class businessman Gregory Samson, who took many responsibilities to overcome problems arise with their children and wife.

Screenings
 2015 International Film Festival of Colombo

Cast
 W. Jayasiri as Gregory Samson
 Nita Fernando
 Lakshman Mendis
 Thusitha Laknath
 Wimal Kumara de Costa
 Chamila Pieris
 Reeni de Silva as Greta
 Daya Thennakoon
 D.B. Gangodathenna
 Vishwajith Gunasekara
 Sangeetha Palliyaguruge

References

External links
 ස්වරූප සහ යථාරූප

2017 films
2010s Sinhala-language films
2017 drama films
Sri Lankan drama films